The 1955 USC Trojans baseball team represented the University of Southern California in the 1955 NCAA baseball season. The Trojans played their home games at Bovard Field. The team was coached by Rod Dedeaux in his 14th year at USC.

The Trojans won the California Intercollegiate Baseball Association championship, the Pacific Coast Conference Tournament and the District VIII Playoff to advance to the College World Series, where they were defeated by the Colgate Red Raiders.

Roster

Schedule 

! style="" | Regular Season
|- valign="top" 

|- align="center" bgcolor="#ffcccc"
| 1 || March 19 ||  || Bovard Field • Los Angeles, California || 6–10 || 0–1 || 0–1
|- align="center" bgcolor="#ccffcc"
| 2 || March 21 ||  || Bovard Field • Los Angeles, California || 17–4 || 1–1 || 0–1
|- align="center" bgcolor="#ccffcc"
| 3 || March 25 ||  || Bovard Field • Los Angeles, California || 8–1 || 2–1 || 1–1
|- align="center" bgcolor="#ccffcc"
| 4 || March 26 || Stanford || Bovard Field • Los Angeles, California || 7–4 || 3–1 || 2–1
|-

|- align="center" bgcolor="#ccffcc"
| 5 || April 1 ||  || Bovard Field • Los Angeles, California || 23–5 || 4–1 || 2–1
|- align="center" bgcolor="#ccffcc"
| 6 || April 4 || at  || Unknown • San Diego, California || 7–2 || 5–1 || 2–1
|- align="center" bgcolor="#ccffcc"
| 7 || April 8 ||  || Bovard Field • Los Angeles, California || 13–7 || 6–1 || 3–1
|- align="center" bgcolor="#ccffcc"
| 8 || April 9 || California || Bovard Field • Los Angeles, California || 18–4 || 7–1 || 4–1
|- align="center" bgcolor="#ccffcc"
| 9 || April 12 ||  || Bovard Field • Los Angeles, California || 29–5 || 8–1 || 4–1
|- align="center" bgcolor="#ccffcc"
| 10 || April 15 || at  || Unknown • Santa Clara, California || 24–2 || 9–1 || 5–1
|- align="center" bgcolor="#ccffcc"
| 11 || April 16 || at California || Edwards Field • Berkeley, California || 5–3 || 10–1 || 6–1
|- align="center" bgcolor="#ccffcc"
| 12 || April 16 || at California || Edwards Field • Berkeley, California || 13–1 || 11–1 || 7–1
|- align="center" bgcolor="#ccffcc"
| 13 || April 26 ||  || Bovard Field • Los Angeles, California || 12–6 || 12–1 || 7–1
|- align="center" bgcolor="#ccffcc"
| 14 || April 29 || Santa Clara || Bovard Field • Los Angeles, California || 11–0 || 13–1 || 8–1
|-

|- align="center" bgcolor="#ccffcc"
| 15 || May 4 ||  || Bovard Field • Los Angeles, California || 19–0 || 14–1 || 8–1
|- align="center" bgcolor="#ccffcc"
| 16 || May 6 || UCLA || Bovard Field • Los Angeles, California || 14–8 || 15–1 || 9–1
|- align="center" bgcolor="#ccffcc"
| 17 || May 7 || at UCLA || Joe E. Brown Field • Los Angeles, California || 7–1 || 16–1 || 10–1
|- align="center" bgcolor="#ccffcc"
| 18 || May 10 || Loyola Marymount || Bovard Field • Los Angeles, California || 14–2 || 17–1 || 10–1
|- align="center" bgcolor="#ccffcc"
| 19 || May 13 || at Santa Clara || Unknown • Santa Clara, California || 13–7 || 18–1 || 11–1
|- align="center" bgcolor="#ccffcc"
| 20 || May 14 || at Stanford || Sunken Diamond • Stanford, California || 8–6 || 19–1 || 12–1
|- align="center" bgcolor="#ffcccc"
| 21 || May 14 || at Stanford || Sunken Diamond • Stanford, California || 2–3 || 19–2 || 12–2
|- align="center" bgcolor="#ffcccc"
| 22 || May 17 || at UCLA || Joe E. Brown Field • Los Angeles, California || 4–18 || 19–3 || 12–3
|-

|-
|-
! style="" | Postseason
|- valign="top"

|- align="center" bgcolor="#ccffcc"
| 23 || May 27 ||  || Bovard Field • Los Angeles, California || 7–1 || 20–3 || 12–3
|- align="center" bgcolor="#ccffcc"
| 24 || May 28 || Oregon || Bovard Field • Los Angeles, California || 10–1 || 21–3 || 12–3
|-

|- align="center" bgcolor="#ccffcc"
| 25 || June 3 ||  || Bovard Field • Los Angeles, California || 11–2 || 22–3 || 12–3
|- align="center" bgcolor="#ccffcc"
| 26 || June 4 || Fresno State || Bovard Field • Los Angeles, California || 15–2 || 23–3 || 12–3
|-

|- align="center" bgcolor="#ffcccc"
| 27 || June 10 || vs Colorado State || Omaha Municipal Stadium • Omaha, Nebraska || 1–2 || 23–4 || 12–3
|- align="center" bgcolor="#ffcccc"
| 28 || June 12 || vs Colgate || Omaha Municipal Stadium • Omaha, Nebraska || 4–6 || 23–5 || 12–3
|-

|-
|

Awards and honors 
John Garten
 Third Team All-American American Baseball Coaches Association
 Second Team All-CIBA

Kent Hadley
 First Team All-CIBA

Vic Lapiner
 First Team All-CIBA

Gerry Mason
 Second Team All-American American Baseball Coaches Association
 First Team All-CIBA

James Oros
 Second Team All-CIBA

Ralph Pausig
 Second Team All-CIBA

Gary Robin
 Second Team All-CIBA

Tony Santino
 First Team All-CIBA

John Stevenson
 Second Team All-CIBA

References 

USC Trojans baseball seasons
USC Trojans baseball
College World Series seasons
USC
Pac-12 Conference baseball champion seasons